Miche is a 1932 French drama film directed by Jean de Marguenat and starring Suzy Vernon, Robert Burnier and Marguerite Moreno.

It was shot at the Joinville Studios in Paris.

Cast
 Suzy Vernon as Micheline  
 Robert Burnier as Jacques de Peyriére  
 Marguerite Moreno as Madame Sorbiet  
 Edith Méra as Countess Esera  
 Magdeleine Bérubet as Madame Carpezaud  
 Armand Dranem as Maître Raphael Demaze  
 Pierre Moreno 
 Sam Pierce as L'américain

References

Bibliography 
 Crisp, Colin. Genre, Myth and Convention in the French Cinema, 1929-1939. Indiana University Press, 2002.

External links 
 

1932 films
1932 drama films
French drama films
1930s French-language films
Films directed by Jean de Marguenat
French films based on plays
French black-and-white films
Films shot at Joinville Studios
1930s French films